Reinhold Daschner (born 16 October 1969) is a German former professional footballer who played as a right-back or midfielder.

References

External links
 
 

1969 births
Living people
German footballers
Association football fullbacks
Association football midfielders
FC Bayern Munich II players
FC Bayern Munich footballers
1. FC Köln players
1. FC Köln II players
Hannover 96 players
Rot Weiss Ahlen players
Bundesliga players
2. Bundesliga players
Footballers from Munich